Arthur or Artur Fischer may refer to:

Arthur Fischer (actor), Swedish actor
Arthur Fischer (footballer), manager of 1. FC Lokomotive Leipzig
Artur Fischer (1919–2016), German inventor
Arthur Fischer, mathematician who worked with Vincent Moncrief

See also
Arthur Fisher (disambiguation)